Hammerjacks was a music venue in downtown Baltimore which operated from 1977 to 2006.  It was founded by Louis J. Principio III. The club attracted many big-name national acts, but also showcased many rising stars in the music world. The bands ranged from punk, glam, thrash and heavy metal acts most commonly associated with the venue (e.g., Guns N' Roses, Kix, Ratt, Skid Row, Extreme or Wrathchild America) to pop (e.g., Badfinger) and alternative rock groups (e.g., Goo Goo Dolls). The club was often frequented by hard core patrons and musicians donning big hair, leather, lace, spandex, and heavy makeup, and was considered a "hard rock shrine." Hammerjacks, however, attracted audiences with other attire as well.

Hammerjacks initially operated from a converted rowhouse on 1000 S. Charles St, then moved to an old brewery building at 1101 S. Howard St in 1982. The building was torn down on June 12, 1997 to make way for an M&T Bank Stadium parking lot. Hammerjacks was billed as "The largest nightclub on the east coast."

In 2000, Hammerjacks reopened at 316-318 Guilford Ave, which had formerly been used as a car wash.  It was then put under new management in 2004, and closed in 2006.

In media
The club was featured in the John Waters' 1994 film Serial Mom, with grunge band L7 playing the band Camel Lips.  It was the location where Kathleen Turner's character Beverly Sutphin was arrested for murder.  Interior and exterior views of the club have been featured in music videos, including the band Kix. 

An image of a sign for the club appeared on the Iron Maiden album "Somewhere In Time".

A New Beginning
In the fall of 2021, a new Hammerjacks location opened at 1300 Russell Street. The new ownership group decided to construct the outdoor portion of the facility first due to the Covid-19 pandemic. The newly constructed facility hosts concerts, special events, private events and Baltimore Ravens tailgate events. Plans for an indoor facility are not yet announced.

References

External links
 Hammerjacks.com

Music venues in Baltimore
Downtown Baltimore
Nightclubs in the United States
Demolished buildings and structures in Baltimore
Buildings and structures demolished in 1997